CK Carinae (CK Car / HD 90382 / SAO 238038) is a variable star in the constellation Carina, the keel of Argo Navis.

Classified as a semiregular variable star, CK Carinae's brightness varies between apparent magnitudes +7.2 and +8.5 with a period of approximately 525 days. It has an MK spectral classification of M3.5 Iab, with the luminosity class indicating an intermediate luminosity supergiant.

CK Carinae is a red supergiant with an effective temperature of 3,550 K. It is one of the largest stars, with a radius 761 to 1,060 times larger than the sun, which means that if it were in the place of the Sun, its surface would reach beyond the asteroid belt, Earth being encompassed within the star.  Consequently, CK Carinae is also a luminous star, radiating between 86,000 and 158,000 times as much energy as the sun.

References 

M-type supergiants
Semiregular variable stars
Carina (constellation)
Durchmusterung objects
090382
Carinae, CK